Pekka Kalevi Niemi (born 14 November 1952) is a retired Finnish heavyweight weightlifter who competed at the 1980 and 1984 Olympics; he finished tenth in 1980 and won a bronze medal in 1984.

Niemi took part in every major international competition between 1977 and 1984, with the best results of fifth-seventh place at the European championships of 1983–84. He did not expect to medal at the 1984 Olympics, and after finishing his attempts went for sightseeing. The officials delayed the award ceremony by a few hours trying to find him, but failed, and went ahead with the empty bronze medal platform. Niemi received his medal next day. Domestically he won 11 consecutive Finnish titles in 1977–88. After retiring from competitions he worked as a weightlifting coach and trained the Finnish weightlifting team in 1995–2001. Starting from 1985 he was also a member of the Athlete’s Commission at the Finnish Olympic Committee. He later worked as a special needs education teacher at the Pirkanmaa Educational Consortium in Tampere.

References

1952 births
Living people
Olympic weightlifters of Finland
Finnish male weightlifters
Weightlifters at the 1980 Summer Olympics
Weightlifters at the 1984 Summer Olympics
Olympic bronze medalists for Finland
Olympic medalists in weightlifting
Medalists at the 1984 Summer Olympics
Sportspeople from Central Ostrobothnia
20th-century Finnish people